The 2014 IFAF U19 World Championship was the third edition of the IFAF U19 World Championship, an international American football tournament for junior teams (19 years and under, or high school football-aged in the United States). It was hosted by Kuwait from July 7 to July 16, with four games each day of the 7th, 10th, 13th, and two medal games each on the 15th and 16th. The teams participating were Canada, reigning champion; Austria, France and Germany, which won qualification at the 2013 European Junior Championship; Kuwait, as host, in their first time in the tournament; Japan, as Asia's participant; USA representing the Americas; and Mexico, which classified by beating Panama.

Participants & Seeding
1. 
2. 
3. 
4. 
5. 
6. 
7. 
8.

Scores

Group stage
Group A

Game Day 1 - July 7th

Game Day 2 - July 10th

Game Day 3 -  July 13th

Group B

Game Day 1 - July 7th

Game Day 2 - July 10th

Game Day 3 - July 13th

Medal Games

Game Day 4 - July 15th

Game Day 5 - July 16th

References
http://ifaf.org/articles/view/1425
http://ifaf.org/articles/view/1536

IFAF Junior World Cup
American football in Asia
IFAF
International sports competitions hosted by Kuwait